Westchase is a placename used in the United States:

Westchase, Florida, a census-designated place in Hillsborough County, near Tampa
Westchase, Houston, Texas, a district within the city limits of Houston